The Bare Hills House is a historic home built about 1856 in the Mount Washington area of Baltimore County, Maryland, United States. It is a two-story frame dwelling with steep gables and board-and batten siding. The house is an example of the Carpenter Gothic style of architecture.

It was listed on the National Register of Historic Places on August 6, 1980.  It is located at 6222 Falls Road in the Bare Hills Historic District.

See also
National Register of Historic Places listings in Baltimore County, Maryland

References

External links
, including photo from 1979, at Maryland Historical Trust

Houses on the National Register of Historic Places in Maryland
Houses in Baltimore County, Maryland
Houses completed in 1856
Carpenter Gothic architecture in Maryland
Carpenter Gothic houses in the United States
Historic district contributing properties in Maryland
National Register of Historic Places in Baltimore County, Maryland